Jon Fugler (born 13 October 1962 in St Austell, Cornwall, England) is an English electronic musician and one of the co-founders of the electronic music group Fluke along with Mike Bryant and Mike Tournier. He first met other members of the band in High Wycombe where he had been involved, along with Tournier, in the band Skin. Both Fugler and Bryant were students at Sir William Borlase's Grammar School in Marlow, Buckinghamshire.

Little is known of Fugler's history until his incorporation into Fluke in 1988 in Beaconsfield, Buckinghamshire.

Notes

1962 births
Living people
English electronic musicians
English keyboardists
Fluke (band) members
People from St Austell